{{Speciesbox
| image = Quercus glaucoides follaje.jpg
| status = LC
| status_system = IUCN3.1
| status_ref = <ref name="iucn status 21 November 2022">{{cite iucn |author=Wenzell , K. |author2=Kenny, L. |date=2017 |title=Quercus glaucoides|volume=2017 |url=https://www.iucnredlist.org/species/78920905/78920908 |access-date=26 November 2022}}</ref>
| genus = Quercus
| display_parents = 2
| parent = Quercus sect. Quercus
| species = glaucoides
| authority = M.Martens & Galeotti
| synonyms_ref = 
| synonyms = 
}}Quercus glaucoides is an oak species in the white oak section, Quercus section Quercus, found in and endemic to eastern, central and southern Mexico (Guanajuato, Guerrero, México State, Hidalgo, Jalisco, Michoacán, Oaxaca, Puebla).

Description Quercus glaucoides is primarily a canopy tree in its native habitat.

Its scientific name is often misapplied to the NE Mexican and central Texas native Lacey oak (Quercus laceyi), which has caused great confusion about the true identity of this species and the correct scientific name for the Lacey oak. Although somewhat related, they do not share the same native range, with Q. glaucoides being endemic to Mexico, while Q. laceyi is native to both northeast Mexico and central Texas, and Q. glaucoides is evergreen, while Q. laceyi'' is deciduous.

References

External links
Trans-Mexican Volcanic Belt Pine-Oak Forests containing Quercus glaucoides
Mexican National Herbarium specimen of Quercus glaucoides

glaucoides
Endemic oaks of Mexico
Plants described in 1843
Flora of the Trans-Mexican Volcanic Belt